The Protocol for the Prohibition of the Use in War of Asphyxiating, Poisonous or other Gases, and of Bacteriological Methods of Warfare, usually called the Geneva Protocol, is a treaty prohibiting the use of chemical and biological weapons in international armed conflicts. It was signed at Geneva on 17 June 1925 and entered into force on 8 February 1928. It was registered in League of Nations Treaty Series on 7 September 1929. The Geneva Protocol is a protocol to the Convention for the Supervision of the International Trade in Arms and Ammunition and in Implements of War signed on the same date, and followed the Hague Conventions of 1899 and 1907.

It prohibits the use of "asphyxiating, poisonous or other gases, and of all analogous liquids, materials or devices" and "bacteriological methods of warfare". This is now understood to be a general prohibition on chemical weapons and biological weapons, but has nothing to say about production, storage or transfer. Later treaties did cover these aspects – the 1972 Biological Weapons Convention (BWC) and the 1993 Chemical Weapons Convention (CWC).

A number of countries submitted reservations when becoming parties to the Geneva Protocol, declaring that they only regarded the non-use obligations as applying to other parties and that these obligations would cease to apply if the prohibited weapons were used against them.

The main elements of the protocol are now considered by many to be part of customary international law.

Negotiation history

In the Hague Conventions of 1899 and 1907, the use of dangerous chemical agents was outlawed. In spite of this, the First World War saw large-scale chemical warfare. France used tear gas in 1914, but the first large-scale successful deployment of chemical weapons was by the German Empire in Ypres, Belgium in 1915, when chlorine gas was released as part of a German attack at the Battle of Gravenstafel. Following this, a chemical arms race began, with the United Kingdom, Russia, Austria-Hungary, the United States, and Italy joining France and Germany in the use of chemical weapons.

This resulted in the development of a range of horrific chemicals affecting lungs, skin, or eyes. Some were intended to be lethal on the battlefield, like hydrogen cyanide, and efficient methods of deploying agents were invented. At least 124,000 tons were produced during the war. In 1918, about one grenade out of three was filled with dangerous chemical agents. Around 1.3 million casualties of the conflict were attributed to the use of gas, and the psychological effect on troops may have had a much greater effect. 

As protective equipment developed, the technology to destroy such equipment became a part of the arms race. The use of deadly poison gas was not only limited to combatants in the front but also civilians, as nearby civilian towns were at risk from winds blowing the poison gases through. Civilians living in towns rarely had any warning systems about the dangers of poison gas, as well as not having access to effective gas masks. The use of chemical weapons employed by both sides had inflicted an estimated 100,000-260,000 civilian casualties during the conflict. Tens of thousands or more, along with military personnel, died from scarring of the lungs, skin damage, and cerebral damage in the years after the conflict ended. In 1920 alone, over 40,000 civilians and 20,000 military personnel died from the chemical weapons effects.

The Treaty of Versailles included some provisions that banned Germany from either manufacturing or importing chemical weapons. Similar treaties banned the First Austrian Republic, the Kingdom of Bulgaria, and the Kingdom of Hungary from chemical weapons, all belonging to the losing side, the Central powers. Russian bolsheviks and Britain continued the use of chemical weapons in the Russian Civil War and possibly in the Middle East in 1920.

Three years after World War I, the Allies wanted to reaffirm the Treaty of Versailles, and in 1922 the United States introduced the Treaty relating to the Use of Submarines and Noxious Gases in Warfare at the Washington Naval Conference. Four of the war victors, the United States, the United Kingdom, the Kingdom of Italy and the Empire of Japan, gave consent for ratification, but it failed to enter into force as the French Third Republic objected to the submarine provisions of the treaty.

At the 1925 Geneva Conference for the Supervision of the International Traffic in Arms the French suggested a protocol for non-use of poisonous gases. The Second Polish Republic suggested the addition of bacteriological weapons. It was signed on 17 June.

Violations

Several countries have deployed or prepared chemical weapons in spite of the treaty; Spain and France did so in the Rif War until 1927, after the signing of the Protocol but prior to its taking effect, Japan used chemical weapons against Taiwan in 1930 during the Musha Incident, Italy used mustard gas against the Ethiopian Empire in the Second Italo-Ethiopian War, and Japan used chemical weapons against China in the Second Sino-Japanese War.

In the Second World War, the U.S., the UK, and Germany prepared the resources to deploy chemical weapons, stockpiling tons of them, but refrained from their use due to the balance of terror: the probability of horrific retaliation. There was an accidental release of mustard gas in Bari, Italy causing many deaths when a U.S. ship carrying CW ammunition was sunk in the harbor during an air raid. After the war, thousands of tons of shells and containers with tabun, sarin and other chemical weapons were disposed of at sea by the Allies.

Early in the Cold War, the UK collaborated with the U.S. in the development of chemical weapons. The Soviet Union also had the facilities to produce chemical weapons but their development was kept secret.

During the 1980-1988 Iran-Iraq War, Iraq is known to have employed a variety of chemical weapons against Iranian forces, as well as nerve agents against Kurdish civilians, the most notorious example of which was 1988 attack on Halabja.

Both the Syrian government and opposition forces accused each other of using chemical weapons in 2013 in Ghouta and Khan al-Assal during the Syrian civil war, though as any such use would be within Syria's own borders, rather than in warfare between state parties to the protocol, the legal situation is less certain. A 2013 United Nations report confirmed the use of sarin, but did not investigate which side used chemical weapons. In 2014, the Organisation for the Prohibition of Chemical Weapons confirmed the use of chlorine gas in the Syrian villages of Talmanes, Al Tamanah and Kafr Zeta, but did not say which side used the gas.

Historical assessment
Eric Croddy, assessing the Protocol in 2005, took the view that the historic record showed it had been largely ineffectual. Specifically it did not prohibit:

 use against not-ratifying parties
 retaliation using such weapons, so effectively making it a no-first-use agreement
 use within a state's own borders in a civil conflict
 research and development of such weapons, or stockpiling them
In light of these shortcomings, Jack Beard notes that "the Protocol (...) resulted in a legal framework that allowed states to conduct [biological weapons] research, develop new biological weapons, and ultimately engage in [biological weapons] arms races".

Despite the U.S. having been a proponent of the protocol, the U.S. military and American Chemical Society lobbied against it, causing the U.S. Senate not to ratify the protocol until 1975, the same year when the United States ratified the Biological Weapons Convention.

Subsequent interpretation of the protocol
In 1966, United Nations General Assembly resolution 2162B called for, without any dissent, all states to strictly observe the protocol. In 1969, United Nations General Assembly resolution 2603 (XXIV) declared that the prohibition on use of chemical and biological weapons in international armed conflicts, as embodied in the protocol (though restated in a more general form), were generally recognized rules of international law. Following this, there was discussion of whether the main elements of the protocol now form part of customary international law, and now this is widely accepted to be the case.

There have been differing interpretations over whether the protocol covers the use of harassing agents, such as adamsite and tear gas, and defoliants and herbicides, such as Agent Orange, in warfare. The 1977 Environmental Modification Convention prohibits the military use of environmental modification techniques having widespread, long-lasting or severe effects. Many states do not regard this as a complete ban on the use of herbicides in warfare, but it does require case-by-case consideration. The 1993 Chemical Weapons Convention effectively banned riot control agents from being used as a method of warfare, though still permitting it for riot control.

In recent times, the protocol has been interpreted to cover internal conflicts as well international ones. In 1995, an appellate chamber in the International Criminal Tribunal for the former Yugoslavia stated that "there had undisputedly emerged a general consensus in the international community on the principle that the use of chemical weapons is also prohibited in internal armed conflicts." In 2005, the International Committee of the Red Cross concluded that customary international law includes a ban on the use of chemical weapons in internal as well as international conflicts.

State parties

To become party to the Protocol, states must deposit an instrument with the government of France (the depositary power). Thirty-eight states originally signed the Protocol. France was the first signatory to ratify the Protocol on 10 May 1926. El Salvador, the final signatory to ratify the Protocol, did so on 26 February 2008. As of April 2021, 146 states have ratified, acceded to, or succeeded to the Protocol, most recently Colombia on 24 November 2015.

Reservations
A number of countries submitted reservations when becoming parties to the Geneva Protocol, declaring that they only regarded the non-use obligations as applying with respect to other parties to the Protocol and/or that these obligations would cease to apply with respect to any state, or its allies, which used the prohibited weapons. Several Arab states also declared that their ratification did not constitute recognition of, or diplomatic relations with, Israel, or that the provision of the Protocol were not binding with respect to Israel. 

Generally, reservations not only modify treaty provisions for the reserving party, but also symmetrically modify the provisions for previously ratifying parties in dealing with the reserving party.  Subsequently, numerous states have withdrawn their reservations, including the former Czechoslovakia in 1990 prior to its dissolution, or the Russian reservation on biological weapons that "preserved the right to retaliate in kind if attacked" with them, which was dissolved by President Yeltsin.

According to the Vienna Convention on Succession of States in respect of Treaties, states which succeed to a treaty after gaining independence from a state party "shall be considered as maintaining any reservation to that treaty which was applicable at the date of the succession of States in respect of the territory to which the succession of States relates unless, when making the notification of succession, it expresses a contrary intention or formulates a reservation which relates to the same subject matter as that reservation."  While some states have explicitly either retained or renounced their reservations inherited on succession, states which have not clarified their position on their inherited reservations are listed as "implicit" reservations.

 

Reservations

Notes

Non-signatory states
The remaining UN member states and UN observers that have not acceded or succeeded to the Protocol are:

Chemical weapons prohibitions

References

Further reading

 Bunn, George. "Gas and germ warfare: international legal history and present status." Proceedings of the National Academy of Sciences of the United States of America 65.1 (1970): 253+. online
 Webster, Andrew. "Making Disarmament Work: The implementation of the international disarmament provisions in the League of Nations Covenant, 1919–1925." Diplomacy and Statecraft 16.3 (2005): 551–569.

External links

 The text of the protocol 
 Weapons of War: Poison Gas

Biological warfare
Chemical warfare
Chemical weapons demilitarization
Arms control treaties
Human rights instruments
Hague Conventions of 1899 and 1907
Treaties concluded in 1925
Treaties entered into force in 1928
Treaties of the Democratic Republic of Afghanistan
Treaties of the People's Socialist Republic of Albania
Treaties of Algeria
Treaties of the People's Republic of Angola
Treaties of Antigua and Barbuda
Treaties of Argentina
Treaties of Australia
Treaties of the First Austrian Republic
Treaties of Bahrain
Treaties of Bangladesh
Treaties of Barbados
Treaties of Belgium
Treaties of the People's Republic of Benin
Treaties of Bhutan
Treaties of Bolivia
Treaties of the military dictatorship in Brazil
Treaties of the Kingdom of Bulgaria
Treaties of Burkina Faso
Treaties of the People's Republic of Kampuchea
Treaties of Cameroon
Treaties of Canada
Treaties of Cape Verde
Treaties of the Central African Republic
Treaties of Chile
Treaties of the Republic of China (1912–1949)
Treaties of Costa Rica
Treaties of Ivory Coast
Treaties of Croatia
Treaties of Cuba
Treaties of Cyprus
Treaties of the Czech Republic
Treaties of Czechoslovakia
Treaties of Denmark
Treaties of the Dominican Republic
Treaties of Ecuador
Treaties of the Kingdom of Egypt
Treaties of El Salvador
Treaties of Equatorial Guinea
Treaties of Estonia
Treaties of the Ethiopian Empire
Treaties of Fiji
Treaties of Finland
Treaties of the French Third Republic
Treaties of the Gambia
Treaties of the Weimar Republic
Treaties of Ghana
Treaties of the Kingdom of Greece
Treaties of Grenada
Treaties of Guatemala
Treaties of Guinea-Bissau
Treaties of the Holy See
Treaties of the Hungarian People's Republic
Treaties of Iceland
Treaties of British India
Treaties of Indonesia
Treaties of Pahlavi Iran
Treaties of Mandatory Iraq
Treaties of Ireland
Treaties of Israel
Treaties of the Kingdom of Italy (1861–1946)
Treaties of Jamaica
Treaties of Japan
Treaties of Jordan
Treaties of Kenya
Treaties of North Korea
Treaties of South Korea
Treaties of Kuwait
Treaties of Laos
Treaties of Latvia
Treaties of Lebanon
Treaties of Lesotho
Treaties of Liberia
Treaties of the Libyan Arab Republic
Treaties of Liechtenstein
Treaties of Lithuania
Treaties of Luxembourg
Treaties of Madagascar
Treaties of Malawi
Treaties of Malaysia
Treaties of the Maldives
Treaties of Malta
Treaties of Mauritius
Treaties of Mexico
Treaties of Moldova
Treaties of Monaco
Treaties of Mongolia
Treaties of Morocco
Treaties of Nepal
Treaties of the Netherlands
Treaties of New Zealand
Treaties of Nicaragua
Treaties of Niger
Treaties of Nigeria
Treaties of Norway
Treaties of Pakistan
Treaties of Panama
Treaties of Papua New Guinea
Treaties of Paraguay
Treaties of Peru
Treaties of the Philippines
Treaties of the Second Polish Republic
Treaties of the Estado Novo (Portugal)
Treaties of Qatar
Treaties of the Kingdom of Romania
Treaties of Russia
Treaties of Rwanda
Treaties of Saint Kitts and Nevis
Treaties of Saint Lucia
Treaties of Saint Vincent and the Grenadines
Treaties of Saudi Arabia
Treaties of Senegal
Treaties of Serbia
Treaties of Sierra Leone
Treaties of Singapore
Treaties of Slovakia
Treaties of Slovenia
Treaties of the Solomon Islands
Treaties of the Union of South Africa
Treaties of the Soviet Union
Treaties of Spain under the Restoration
Treaties of the Dominion of Ceylon
Treaties of the Democratic Republic of the Sudan
Treaties of Eswatini
Treaties of Sweden
Treaties of Switzerland
Treaties of Syria
Treaties of Tanzania
Treaties of Thailand
Treaties of Togo
Treaties of Tonga
Treaties of Trinidad and Tobago
Treaties of Tunisia
Treaties of Turkey
Treaties of Uganda
Treaties of Ukraine
Treaties of the United Kingdom
Treaties of the United States
Treaties of Uruguay
Treaties of Venezuela
Treaties of Vietnam
Treaties of the Yemen Arab Republic
Treaties of South Yemen
Treaties extended to Curaçao and Dependencies
Treaties extended to Greenland
Treaties extended to the Faroe Islands
Treaties extended to the Dutch East Indies
Treaties extended to Surinam (Dutch colony)